Pádraic Mannion (born 6 March 1993) is an Irish hurler, he also plays as a right wing-back for club side Ahascragh-Fohenagh and at inter-county level with the Galway senior hurling team. His brother, Cathal, also plays for both teams.

Playing career

College
Mannion first came to prominence as a hurler with St Cuan's College in Castleblakeney, winning a Connacht Junior C Championship title with the school in 2009.

University
As a student at NUI Galway, Mannion was a regular player on the university's senior hurling team in the Fitzgibbon Cup.

Club
Mannion joined the Ahascragh-Fohenagh club at a young age and played in all grades at juvenile and underage levels, enjoying championship success in the minor and under-21 grades, before joining the club's top adult team. He also plays Gaelic football with the Caltra club.

On 23 October 2016, Mannion was captain of the Ahascragh-Fohenagh that defeated Ballinderreen by 2-15 to 0-08 in the final of the Galway Intermediate Championship. He later won a Connacht Championship medal after a 2-20 to 0-13 defeat of Ballyhaunis in a final replay. On 18 February 2017, Mannion captained the team from centre-back in a 2-15 to 0-06 All-Ireland final defeat by Carrickshock.

Inter-county

Minor
Mannion first played for Galway as a member of the minor hurling team on 23 July 2011. He made his first appearance in an 8-26 to 0-12 All-Ireland quarter-final defeat of Antrim at Parnell Park. On 4 September 2011, Mannion was at left corner-back for Galway's 1-21 to 1-12 defeat of Dublin in the All-Ireland final at Croke Park.

Intermediate
As a member of the Galway intermediate hurling team, Mannion made his only appearance for the team on 18 August 2012 in a 0-21 to 1-13 All-Ireland semi-final defeat by Kilkenny.

Senior
Mannion made his debut for the Galway senior team on 22 February 2015 in a 2-18 to 0-20 National Hurling League defeat by Tipperary. He later made his first championship start on 6 June 2015 in a 5-19 to 1-18 defeat of Dublin. On 6 September 2015, Mannion was at left corner-back for Galway's 1-22 to 1-18 defeat by Kilkenny in the All-Ireland final.

On 23 April 2017, Mannion was at right wing-back when Galway defeated Tipperary by 3-21 to 0-14 to win the National Hurling League. Later that season he won his first Leinster Championship medal after Galway's 0-29 to 1-17 defeat of Wexford in the final. On 3 September 2017, Mannion started for Galway at right wing-back when they won their first All-Ireland in 29 years after a 0-26 to 2-17 defeat of Waterford in the final. He ended the season by winning an All-Star award.

On 8 July 2018, Mannion won a second successive Leinster Championship medal following Galway's 1-28 to 3-15 defeat of Kilkenny in the final.

Career statistics

Honours
St Cuan's College
Connacht Colleges Junior C Hurling Championship (1): 2009

Ahascragh-Fohenagh
Connacht Intermediate Club Hurling Championship (1): 2016
Galway Intermediate Hurling Championship (1): 2016
Galway Under-21 B Hurling Championship (1): 2011
Galway Under-21 C Hurling Championship (1): 2010
Galway Minor B Hurling Championship (1): 2009

Galway
All-Ireland Senior Hurling Championship (1): 2017 
Leinster Senior Hurling Championship (2): 2017, 2018
National Hurling League Division 1 (2): 2017, 2021
All-Ireland Minor Hurling Championship (1): 2011

Awards
The Sunday Game Team of the Year (3): 2017, 2018, 2022
The Sunday Game Hurler of the Year (1): 2018
GAA GPA All Stars Awards (3): 2017, 2018, 2022

References

1993 births
Living people
Ahascragh-Fohenagh hurlers
All-Ireland Senior Hurling Championship winners
Alumni of the University of Galway
Caltra Gaelic footballers
Dual players
Galway inter-county hurlers
Hurling backs
University of Galway hurlers